Raggamuffin Vol 2 is a New Zealand and Australian compilation album released to coincide with the upcoming Raggamuffin Music Festival in 2009. It contains two tracks from each of the nine artists appearing on the Raggamuffin Festival 2009 bill—featuring Ziggy Marley, Eddy Grant, Ali Campbell, Shaggy, Arrested Development, Inner Circle, Kora, Unity Pacific, & Three Houses Down.

Track listing
 'Brothers And  Sisters' - 2:48 - Ziggy Marley & The Melody Makers
 'Do You Feel My Love' - 2:59 - Eddy Grant
 'That Look In Your Eye' - 4:03 - Ali Campbell
 'Oh Carolina' - 3:13 - Shaggy
 'Cold Nights' - 4:31 - Arrested Development
 'Sweat (A La La La La Long)' - 3:48 - Inner Circle
 'Politician' - 4:38 - Kora
 'Red Squad' - 4:32 - Unity Pacific
 'Ghettoword (Move Your Feet)' - 4:38 - Three Houses Down
 'Dandyman' - 3:31 - Three Houses Down
 'A Poor Man (Saveth A City)' - 5:29 - Unity Pacific
 'Culture' - 6:28 - Kora
 'Games People Play' - 3:27 - Inner Circle
 'Hit The Road Jack' - 3:14 - Arrested Developmentfeat. Rasa Don
 'In The Summertime' - 3:58 - Shaggy feat. Rayvon
 'Let Your Yeah Be Yeah' - 4:15 - Ali Campbell
 'Gimme Hope Jo'anna' - 3:44 - Eddy Grant
 'Tomorrow People' - 3:42 - Ziggy Marley & The Melody Makers

2008 compilation albums
Reggae compilation albums